A Life of Her Own is a 1950 American melodrama film directed by George Cukor and starring Lana Turner and Ray Milland. The screenplay by Isobel Lennart focuses on an aspiring model who leaves her small town in the Midwest to seek fame and fortune in New York City. The film was produced by Voldemar Vetluguin and distributed by Metro-Goldwyn-Mayer.

Plot
Lily Brannel James (Lana Turner) leaves her small home town in Kansas for New York City, and she is hired by the Thomas Caraway Model Agency. She befriends former top model Mary Ashlon (Ann Dvorak), who becomes her mentor. Mary is depressed about her floundering career and, following a night of excessive drinking, she commits suicide.

Lily eventually becomes a very successful model. As a favor to her attorney friend Jim Leversoe (Louis Calhern), she spends some time with Steve Harleigh (Ray Milland), a Montana copper-mine owner in New York on business. The two fall in love, but both realize nothing can come of it. After Steve goes home, he has Jim buy Lily a bracelet, but she refuses to accept it.

Lily finds that success does not fill the void in her life. When Steve returns to New York to secure a loan, he runs into her. He tells her he is married. His wife Nora was left a paraplegic in an automobile accident for which he was responsible. Despite this, their feelings for each other are too strong, and they embark on an affair.

Matters come to a head when Nora (Margaret Phillips) visits him to celebrate his birthday. On the night of Steve's birthday, Lily hosts a party too, even though Steve stays with Nora, who is making some progress in relearning to walk with crutches. Steve slips out to Lily's party and is taken aback by her self-destructive behavior.

Lily decides to confront Nora and asks family friend Jim to accompany her. However, when she sees how nice Nora is and how dependent she is on her husband, Lily cannot bring herself to tell her about her involvement with Steve. On the way out, she bumps into Steve at the elevator and tells him it is over.

Some time later, Lily runs into advertising executive Lee Gorrance (Barry Sullivan), who had been dating Mary just prior to her death.  When Lily resists his romantic advances, he predicts she will end up lonely and depressed like Mary. Upset by his comments, Lily considers ending her own life, but finally resolves to remain strong, even if she is lonely.

Cast

 Lana Turner as Lily Brannel James 
 Ray Milland as Steve Harleigh 
 Tom Ewell as Tom Caraway 
 Louis Calhern as Jim Leversoe 
 Ann Dvorak as Mary Ashlon 
 Barry Sullivan as Lee Gorrance
 Margaret Phillips as Nora Harleigh 
 Jean Hagen as Maggie Collins
 Phyllis Kirk as Jerry
 Sara Haden as Smitty
 Hermes Pan as Specialty Dancer

Production

The story was loosely adapted from British author Rebecca West's "The Abiding Vision", from her 1935 book The Harsh Voice: Four Short Novels. Motion Picture Production Code administrator Joseph Breen rejected the original script as unacceptable, terming it "shocking and highly offensive" for its portrayal of "adultery and commercialized prostitution", while a revised version was found to have "insufficient compensating moral values". In order to bring the story into agreement with the Production Code, screenwriter Isobel Lennart was required to "show that the adulterous situation is wrong and that sinners must be punished for their sin".

Vincente Minnelli originally was assigned to direct the film, but numerous script revisions and problems with casting delayed the start of production by several months, and Minnelli began work on Father of the Bride instead. Lana Turner initially refused to star in the film, but MGM executives Louis B. Mayer and Dore Schary demanded she honor her contract with the studio. Howard Keel, Cary Grant, George Murphy, and James Mason were among those considered for the role of Steve Harleigh, which eventually went to Wendell Corey, who worked on the production through mid-February 1950 but then allegedly asked to be released from the film because he felt he wasn't right for the role. Other sources claimed he was dismissed at the request of Turner and director George Cukor following an argument between the two stars (supposedly Corey, after an inadvertent wardrobe delay by Turner, made a remark that Barbara Stanwyck, whose husband Robert Taylor was reportedly having an affair with Turner, wouldn't have kept everyone waiting; Turner then demanded a casting change). He was replaced by Ray Milland.

The film's original ending had Lily leaping to her death, but the studio insisted on a happier finale. Cukor disapproved of the studio's interference and was unhappy with the film as it was released.

Music
As revealed in the liner notes of the Film Score Monthly release of the music from the film, the main theme for this film would be reused by the composer in the 1952 MGM film Invitation.

Critical reception
Variety observed, "The soap opera plotting has been polished to considerable extent, the playing by the femme cast members is topnotch and the direction aids them, but it is still a true confession type of yarn concerned with a big city romance between a married man and a beautiful model. Script is spotted with feeling and character, and also a lot of conversation that doesn't mean much. A decided asset is Lana Turner's performance."

Awards and nominations
Bronisław Kaper was nominated for the Golden Globe Award for Best Original Score but lost to Franz Waxman for Sunset Boulevard.

Box office
According to MGM's records, the film earned $1,413,000 in the US and Canada and $504,000 elsewhere, resulting in a loss to the studio of $679,000.

References

External links

 
 
 
Sound samples of the film score

1950 films
1950 drama films
Adultery in films
American black-and-white films
American drama films
Films about modeling
Films directed by George Cukor
Films scored by Bronisław Kaper
Films set in New York City
Films set in the 1950s
Melodrama films
Metro-Goldwyn-Mayer films
1950s English-language films
1950s American films